Ananta is a mountain in the Vilcanota mountain range in the Andes of Peru, about  high. It is situated in the Puno Region, Carabaya Province, Corani District. Ananta lies south of the mountain Macho Ritti, west of the lake Mancacocha and north of the lake Puytococha.

References

Mountains of Peru
Mountains of Puno Region